The Camlaren Mine was a small gold mine  north-east of Yellowknife, Northwest Territories, Canada at Gordon Lake. It consists of a property totaling about 981 hectares. The two claims that make up the property were staked in 1936 by prospectors Don Cameron and the Mclaren brothers and developed with two shafts during 1937–1938. The name "Camlaren" is a portmanteau of Cameron and McLaren. Conditions attributed to World War II halted development at Camlaren in 1939.

The mine did not produce any gold until 1963 when more modernized mining methods were introduced.

In 1980, Mining Corporation of Canada Limited erected a milling plant at Camlaren and produced another  of gold in the next two years. 
There are two other potential production sites on the property that have not been developed.

Infrastructure was demolished in 1991 and only the old chimney from the 1937 mine manager's house remains.

The Camlaren property is now part of the Gordon Lake Project.

References

Buildings and structures demolished in 1991
Gold mines in the Northwest Territories
Underground mines in Canada